La Nora or La Nora del Río is a locality located in the municipality of Alija del Infantado, in León province, Castile and León, Spain. As of 2020, it has a population of 80.

Geography 
La Nora is located 65km south-southwest of León, Spain.

References

Populated places in the Province of León